The cantons of the Allier department of France, have number 19 since the cantonal realignment of 2014. Prior to 2014, Allier had 33 cantons.

Current composition

References